Crowdpac is a for-profit website founded in 2014, with the purpose of helping unknown Democratic political outsiders raise money and run for office, and to track political data from across the United States. While it was originally marketed as a non-partisan political fundraising site, the platform is currently only open for fundraising to select political ideologies.

History 
Crowdpac was co-founded in 2014 by Steve Hilton, a former political advisor to British Prime Minister David Cameron, along with Adam Bonica, Gisel Kordestani, and Paul Hilder. The website is based in San Francisco, and Hilton served as its CEO until 2018. One of the company's most successful crowdfunding campaigns was for Kathryn Allen, who raised three times as much money as incumbent Congressman Jason Chaffetz, before Chaffetz announced that he would not run for re-election. The website also uses an algorithm built by researchers at Stanford University to track political candidates' sources of funding to predict how ideologically partisan they are.

In May 2018, Crowdpac announced that it was suspending fundraising for Republican candidates on its platform because of issues with "hate speech and the rhetoric and actions used to stir up racial animosity legitimized by the President of the United States".  At the same time, Hilton was fired as CEO due to his relationship with Fox News as a conservative political pundit and his conflicting values with the company, with Jesse Thomas appointed as acting CEO.

The website suspended all donations and closed on June 19, 2019. The site was acquired by Prytany and relaunched in November 2019.

Criticisms 
Crowdpac was criticized for promoting endorsements by Ron Conway, one of its investors and a candidate for office, in a 2015 election in San Francisco.

Although launched with the aim to be a non-partisan platform, in 2018 the company acting CEO Jesse Thomas decided to block Republican candidates from raising on the platform, stating "This decision has been a hard one for our company, but as Trumpism has spread through the Republican Party we’ve started to see an increase in campaigns for Republican candidates that we cannot allow on our platform." Thomas cited an example of a neo-Nazi candidate, who was kicked out of the Republican convention, attempting to raise money through the website.

See also 

 Comparison of crowdfunding services

References

Internet properties established in 2014
Crowdfunding platforms of the United States
American political websites
Campaign finance in the United States
Companies based in San Francisco